Bang bang chicken, also known by variant names such as bam bam chicken or bon bon chicken, is a popular chicken dish in Chinese cuisine. The name bang bang chicken is derived from the manner in which the meat is tenderized using a stick or hammer.

Legend 

According to a legend concerning the Ming and Qing dynasties, there was a dedicated chef in the remote areas of Ya'an who enjoyed experimenting with foods. After studying and practicing the art of soup-mixing for a long time, he successfully invented a formula to produce aromatic chicken meat and broth. However, chicken was a luxury and was only served on holidays.
 

Someone came up with a strategy: cut the whole chicken into thin slices and sell it by slice. This strategy proved to be very effective, and "chicken slices" gained a good reputation. However, another problem occurred: a kitchen knife could not cut a whole chicken into slices evenly, and customers are often picky when making purchases. However, it was found that beating the chicken into pieces with a giant stick would solve this problem. At the same time, juice broth infuses into the chicken and adds flavor. When preparing the dish, one holds a stick and another holds a knife; the sound made by the stick and the knife striking each other has a rhythmic, almost musical quality, hence the name bang bang chicken.

See also

 List of Chinese dishes

References

Further reading
 1001 Foods To Die For - Madison Books, Andrews McMeel Publishing, LLC. p. 396.
 Simply Allergy-Free: Quick and Tasty Recipes for Every Night of the Week - Elizabeth Gordon
 Art of Chinese Cooking – Rebekah Lin Jewell. p. 54.
 Some Like it Hot: Spicy Favorites from the World's Hot Zones - Clifford A. Wright
 Mrs. Chiang's Szechwan Cookbook - Ellen Schrecker. pp. 228–233.
 Spicy Sichuan Cooking – Daniel Reid
 Soups & salads - Sandi Cooper
 Roast Chicken and Other Stories – Simon Hopkinson

External links
 "Dinner Tonight: Bon Bon Chicken". Serious Eats.

 

Chinese chicken dishes
Sichuan cuisine